Ilie G. Murgulescu (Cornu, 27 January 1902 – Bucharest, 28 October 1991) was a Romanian physical chemist and a communist politician. He was president of the Romanian Academy (1960–1963) and Minister of Education (1953–1956 and 1960–1963). He founded the Institute of Physical Chemistry of the Romanian Academy where he presided until 1977. His investigations on physical chemistry covered a broad realm. Among main results can be cited those he got on molten salts electrochemistry. He did doctoral work on Copper thiosulfate complex photochemistry under Fritz Weigert in Leipzig as adviser.

His son participated in manifestations of support towards the Hungarian revolution in 1956. This event affected Murgulescu's position in the government. After a while he  was  reinstated at the Ministry of Education.

He was elected honorary member of the Hungarian Academy of Sciences.
He authored a series of didactic books in 7 volumes on Physical chemistry called Introduction to Physical Chemistry printed between 1976-1984.

In 1981, Murgulescu became a founding member of the World Cultural Council.

Notes

References
Magyar Nagy Lexikon (Great Hungarian Lexicon)

External links
Ilie G. Murgulescu l
Acad. Ilie MURGULESCU (1902 – 1991) Chimist, inventator, presedinte al Academiei Romine

1902 births
1991 deaths
Founding members of the World Cultural Council
People from Dolj County
Romanian physical chemists
Presidents of the Romanian Academy
Romanian Ministers of Education
Rectors of the University of Bucharest
Rectors of Politehnica University of Timișoara